The far-right leagues were several French far-right movements opposed to parliamentarism, which mainly dedicated themselves to military parades, street brawls, demonstrations and riots. The term ligue was often used in the 1930s to distinguish these political movements from parliamentary parties. After having appeared first at the end of the 19th century, during the Dreyfus affair, they became common in the 1920s and 1930s, and famously participated in the 6 February 1934 crisis and riots which overthrew the second Cartel des gauches, i.e. the center-left coalition government led by Édouard Daladier.

For a long time, the French left wing had been convinced that these riots had been an attempted coup d'état against the French Republic. Although contemporary historians have shown that, despite the riots and the ensuing collapse of the governing left wing, there had been no organized plans to overthrow Daladier's Radical-Socialist government, this widespread belief led to the creation of the anti-fascist movement in France, and later to the dissolving of these leagues in 1936 by the leftist Popular Front government headed by Léon Blum.

Debate on "French Fascism" 

The debate on a "French Fascism" is closely related to the existence of these anti-parliamentary leagues, of which many adopted at least the exterior signs and rituals of fascism (Roman salute, etc.) and explicitly imitated on one hand Mussolini's squadristis or, on the other hand, Hitler's Nazi party's organization — one should bear in mind, when analyzing "French fascism", international relations: in the 1930s, conservative president of the Council Pierre Laval initiated relations with Mussolini's Italy and the USSR against Germany, seen as the "hereditary enemy" of France (see French–German enmity). After Laval's meeting with Mussolini in Rome on 4 January 1935, this policy led to the signature of the Stresa front in 1935. Thus, the French far-right was split between Italian fascism, Nazism and nationalism, which forbade them from allying themselves with Hitler and pushed towards an alliance with Mussolini. Individual trajectories during Vichy France, when some far-right members ultimately chose the Resistance against the German occupant, illustrate these ideological conflicts.

Leagues created in the 1920s from veterans' associations are usually distinguished from those created in the 1930s, such as Marcel Bucard's Francisme, which were more explicitly influenced by Fascism or Nazism — one of these reasons being the common anti-militarism, pacifism and opposition to colonial expansion present in several veterans' associations of the 1920s. Leagues however quickly broke with this left-wing anti-militarism and anti-colonialism. Both Cartels des Gauches (Left Wing Coalition, the first from 1924 to 1926 and the second from 1932 to the 6 February 1934 riots) saw the appearance of many leagues intent on overthrowing them through street demonstrations. Thus, Pierre Taittinger's Jeunesses Patriotes (JP) were founded during the first Cartel, headed by Édouard Herriot, in 1924, as well as Georges Valois's Faisceau (1925) and colonel de la Rocque's Croix-de-Feu, founded a year after Herriot's fall. On the other hand, François Coty's Solidarité française and Marcel Bucard's Francisme were both founded in 1933, during Édouard Daladier's left-wing government. Daladier was replaced after the 6 February 1934 riots by conservative Gaston Doumergue, who included in his cabinet many right wing personalities close to the far-right leagues, such as Philippe Pétain and Pierre Laval.

Most of the debate on the existence of a "French fascism" in between the two wars period has focused on these paramilitary leagues, although most French historians agree in stating that as Fascism is by definition a "mass movement", these leagues do not qualify as such. This, of course, has been debated, since some of them, such as colonel de la Rocque's Croix-de-Feu were very popular and had a quite large membership. De la Rocque, however, who later went on to found the Parti Social Français (PSF, the first French mass party of the right-wing, which would be later imitated by Gaullism), has often been said not to be fascist, an assertion which based itself in particular on his respect for constitutional legality during 6 February 1934 riots. Others observers argue that both Fascism and Nazism formally respected legality, and that this factor, in itself, does not sufficiently set de la Rocque's movement aside from other types of fascism.

Significant leagues 
Far-right leagues in France were characterized by their nationalist, militarist, anti-Semitic, anti-parliamentarist and anti-Communist opinions. In addition – and in particular in the 1930s – they were often modelled after Benito Mussolini's paramilitary Blackshirts and favored military parades, uniforms, and displays of their physical might.

The most famous far-right leagues included:

Ligue of Patriots (Ligue des Patriotes) led by Paul Déroulède (founded in 1882, revived in 1896 during the Dreyfus Affair and finally dissolved soon afterwards)
Antisemitic League of France (Ligue antisémitique de France) led by Édouard Drumont (founded in 1889, disappeared before World War I)
King's Camelots (Camelots du Roi), founded in 1908. Youth organization of the far-right royalist Action Française movement, which was involved in the February 1934 riots.
Young Patriots (Jeunesses Patriotes), founded in 1924 by Pierre Taittinger. Claiming the legacy of Déroulède's League of Patriots, it also took part in the February 1934 riots. Presenting itself as a movement in favor of stronger executive power and with the officially proclaimed aims of "defending institutions from the left wing", the Young Patriots adopted ceremonial signs popularised by fascists (such as the Roman salute) but conserved, on the whole, a reactionary program distinct from fascism.
Peasant Defense (Défense Paysanne), also known as Green Shirts (Chemises Vertes)
Peasant Front (Front Paysan), founded by Henry Dorgères
Frontisme, founded by Gaston Bergery.
Le Faisceau, a fascist party founded in 1925 by Georges Valois. Heavily inspired by Mussolini's fascism, the Faisceau claimed to make the synthesis between socialism and nationalism, which is at the basis of national-socialist ideology. It reached its peak in 1926, with 25,000 members of "Blue Shirts" (modelled after the Blackshirts in Italy), before dissolving due to internal disputes.
Cross of Fire (Croix-de-Feu), an association of veterans, founded in 1927. Headed by François de La Rocque, it staged a peaceful rally on 6 February 1934 and did not take part in the riots. It gradually became moderate, eventually transforming into a democratic centre-right party, the Parti Social Français (1936–40). During World War II, La Rocque used his party as an intelligence resistance network linked with the British intelligence. It paved the way to Gaullism.
French Solidarity (Solidarité Française), founded in 1933 by perfume businessman François Coty (1874–1934).
Francist Movement (Mouvement Franciste), founded by Marcel Bucard in September 1933. Partly funded by Mussolini, it was dissolved in 1936 following the prohibition by the Popular Front government, only to reappear in 1941 under the Vichy regime. Its members were some of the most enthusiastic collaborators with the Nazis.

Dissolution of the leagues 

This context of street agitation led Pierre Laval's government to outlaw paramilitary organizations on 6 December 1935, and then to pass the 10 January 1936 law on militias and combat groups. This law limited the right of association (resulting from the 1901 law on associations) if these groups organized armed demonstrations in the streets, if they presented a paramilitary or militia aspect or if they attempted to overthrow the Republic or threatened the integrity of the national territory. The 10 January 1936 law was however only partially implemented, and only the monarchist Action Française was dissolved as a result of the law, on 13 February 1936.

The Popular Front thus included the dissolution of the leagues in its 12 January 1936 electoral program. This proposition was implemented after the May 1936 election which brought Léon Blum to power. Marceau Pivert publicly called for the dissolution of the leagues on 27 May 1936 in the newspaper Le Populaire.

On 19 June 1936, interior minister Roger Salengro had President Albert Lebrun sign a decree outlawing the major leagues, which were soon dissolved (these included Croix-de-Feu, Solidarité Française, Jeune Patrie and Francistes). Three days later, La Rocque bypassed the dissolution of his Croix-de-Feu association by creating the Parti Social Français (PSF). Salengro's initiative led the far-right newspaper Gringoire (which at the time had a circulation of 500,000 issues per week) to initiate a defamation campaign against him, which finally drove him to commit suicide on 18 November 1936.

See also 
Revanchism
Dreyfus Affair
Both Cartel des gauches (1924–26, and 1932–34)
6 February 1934 crisis marked by riots organized by far-right leagues
History of far-right movements in France
Non-conformists of the 1930s
Freikorps – similar right-wing paramilitary movements in Weimar Germany
Uyoku dantai – similar phenomenon in post-war Japan

References

Further reading 

 Gooch, Robert K. (1927). "The Antiparliamentary Movement in France". American Political Science Review. 21 (3): 552–572.

 
20th century in France
19th century in France